A caldera is a large cauldron-like hollow that forms shortly after the emptying of a magma chamber in a volcano eruption. When large volumes of magma are erupted over a short time, structural support for the rock above the magma chamber is gone. The ground surface then collapses into the emptied or partially emptied magma chamber, leaving a large depression at the surface (from one to dozens of kilometers in diameter). Although sometimes described as a crater, the feature is actually a type of sinkhole, as it is formed through subsidence and collapse rather than an explosion or impact. Compared to the thousands of volcanic eruptions that occur each century, the formation of a caldera is a rare event, occurring only a few times per century. Only seven caldera-forming collapses are known to have occurred between 1911 and 2016. More recently, a caldera collapse occurred at Kīlauea, Hawaii in 2018.

Etymology 
The term caldera comes from Spanish , and Latin , meaning "cooking pot".  In some texts the English term cauldron is also used, though in more recent work the term cauldron refers to a caldera that has been deeply eroded to expose the beds under the caldera floor. The term caldera was introduced into the geological vocabulary by the German geologist Leopold von Buch when he published his memoirs of his 1815 visit to the Canary Islands, where he first saw the Las Cañadas caldera on Tenerife, with Mount Teide dominating the landscape, and then the Caldera de Taburiente on La Palma.

Caldera formation

A collapse is triggered by the emptying of the magma chamber beneath the volcano, sometimes as the result of a large explosive volcanic eruption (see Tambora in 1815), but also during effusive eruptions on the flanks of a volcano (see Piton de la Fournaise in 2007) or in a connected fissure system (see Bárðarbunga in 2014–2015). If enough magma is ejected, the emptied chamber is unable to support the weight of the volcanic edifice above it. A roughly circular fracture, the "ring fault", develops around the edge of the chamber. Ring fractures serve as feeders for fault intrusions which are also known as ring dikes. Secondary volcanic vents may form above the ring fracture. As the magma chamber empties, the center of the volcano within the ring fracture begins to collapse. The collapse may occur as the result of a single cataclysmic eruption, or it may occur in stages as the result of a series of eruptions. The total area that collapses may be hundreds of square kilometers.

Mineralization in calderas 

Some calderas are known to host rich ore deposits. Metal-rich fluids can circulate through the caldera, forming hydrothermal ore deposits of metals such as lead, silver, gold, mercury, lithium, and uranium. One of the world's best-preserved mineralized calderas is the Sturgeon Lake Caldera in northwestern Ontario, Canada, which formed during the Neoarchean era about 2.7 billion years ago. In the San Juan volcanic field, ore veins were emplaced in fractures associated with several calderas, with the greatest mineralization taking place near the youngest and most silicic intrusions associated with each caldera.

Types of caldera

Explosive caldera eruptions

Explosive caldera eruptions are produced by a magma chamber whose magma is rich in silica. Silica-rich magma has a high viscosity, and therefore does not flow easily like basalt. The magma typically also contains a large amount of dissolved gases, up to 7 wt% for the most silica-rich magmas. When the magma approaches the surface of the Earth, the drop in confining pressure causes the trapped gases to rapidly bubble out of the magma, fragmenting the magma to produce a mixture of volcanic ash and other tephra with the very hot gases.

The mixture of ash and volcanic gases initially rises into the atmosphere as an eruption column. However, as the volume of erupted material increases, the eruption column is unable to entrain enough air to remain buoyant, and the eruption column collapses into a tephra fountain that falls back to the surface to form pyroclastic flows. Eruptions of this type can spread ash over vast areas, so that ash flow tuffs emplaced by silicic caldera eruptions are the only volcanic product with volumes rivaling those of flood basalts. For example, when Yellowstone Caldera last erupted some 650,000 years ago, it released about 1,000 km3 of material (as measured in dense rock equivalent (DRE)), covering a substantial part of North America in up to two metres of debris.

Eruptions forming even larger calderas are known, such as the La Garita Caldera in the San Juan Mountains of Colorado, where the  Fish Canyon Tuff was blasted out in eruptions about 27.8 million years ago.

The caldera produced by such eruptions is typically filled in with tuff, rhyolite, and other igneous rocks. The caldera is surrounded by an outflow sheet of ash flow tuff (also called an ash flow sheet).

If magma continues to be injected into the collapsed magma chamber, the center of the caldera may be uplifted in the form of a resurgent dome such as is seen at the Valles Caldera, Lake Toba, the San Juan volcanic field, Cerro Galán, Yellowstone, and many other calderas.

Because a silicic caldera may erupt hundreds or even thousands of cubic kilometers of material in a single event, it can cause catastrophic environmental effects. Even small caldera-forming eruptions, such as Krakatoa in 1883 or Mount Pinatubo in 1991, may result in significant local destruction and a noticeable drop in temperature around the world. Large calderas may have even greater effects. The ecological effects of the eruption of a large caldera can be seen in the record of the Lake Toba eruption in Indonesia.

At some points in geological time, rhyolitic calderas have appeared in distinct clusters. The remnants of such clusters may be found in places such as the Eocene Rum Complex of Scotland, the San Juan Mountains of Colorado (formed during the Oligocene, Miocene, and Pliocene epochs) or the Saint Francois Mountain Range of Missouri (erupted during the Proterozoic eon).

Valles

For their 1968 paper that first introduced the concept of a resurgent caldera to geology, R.L. Smith and R.A. Bailey chose the Valles caldera as their model. Although the Valles caldera is not unusually large, it is relatively young (1.25 million years old) and unusually well preserved, and it remains one of the best studied examples of a resurgent caldera. The ash flow tuffs of the Valles caldera, such as the Bandelier Tuff, were among the first to be thoroughly characterized.

Toba

About 74,000 years ago, this Indonesian volcano released about  dense-rock equivalent of ejecta. This was the largest known eruption during the ongoing Quaternary period (the last 2.6 million years) and the largest known explosive eruption during the last 25 million years. In the late 1990s, anthropologist Stanley Ambrose proposed that a volcanic winter induced by this eruption reduced the human population to about 2,000–20,000 individuals, resulting in a population bottleneck. More recently, Lynn Jorde and Henry Harpending proposed that the human species was reduced to approximately 5,000–10,000 people. There is no direct evidence, however, that either theory is correct, and there is no evidence for any other animal decline or extinction, even in environmentally sensitive species. There is evidence that human habitation continued in India after the eruption.

Non-explosive calderas

Some volcanoes, such as the large shield volcanoes Kīlauea and Mauna Loa on the island of Hawaii, form calderas in a different fashion. The magma feeding these volcanoes is basalt, which is silica poor. As a result, the magma is much less viscous than the magma of a rhyolitic volcano, and the magma chamber is drained by large lava flows rather than by explosive events. The resulting calderas are also known as subsidence calderas and can form more gradually than explosive calderas. For instance, the caldera atop Fernandina Island collapsed in 1968 when parts of the caldera floor dropped .

Extraterrestrial calderas
Since the early 1960s, it has been known that volcanism has occurred on other planets and moons in the Solar System. Through the use of crewed and uncrewed spacecraft, volcanism has been discovered on Venus, Mars, the Moon, and Io, a satellite of Jupiter. None of these worlds have plate tectonics, which contributes approximately 60% of the Earth's volcanic activity (the other 40% is attributed to hotspot volcanism). Caldera structure is similar on all of these planetary bodies, though the size varies considerably.

The Moon

The Moon has an outer shell of low-density crystalline rock that is a few hundred kilometers thick, which formed due to a rapid creation. The craters of the Moon have been well preserved through time and were once thought to have been the result of extreme volcanic activity, but are currently believed to have been formed by meteorites, nearly all of which took place in the first few hundred million years after the Moon formed. Around 500 million years afterward, the Moon's mantle was able to be extensively melted due to the decay of radioactive elements. Massive basaltic eruptions took place generally at the base of large impact craters. Also, eruptions may have taken place due to a magma reservoir at the base of the crust. This forms a dome, possibly the same morphology of a shield volcano where calderas universally are known to form. Although caldera-like structures are rare on the Moon, they are not completely absent. The Compton-Belkovich Volcanic Complex on the far side of the Moon is thought to be a caldera, possibly an ash-flow caldera.

Mars

The volcanic activity of Mars is concentrated in two major provinces: Tharsis and Elysium. Each province contains a series of giant shield volcanoes that are similar to what we see on Earth and likely are the result of mantle hot spots. The surfaces are dominated by lava flows, and all have one or more collapse calderas. Mars has the largest volcano in the Solar System, Olympus Mons, which is more than three times the height of Mount Everest, with a diameter of 520 km (323 miles). The summit of the mountain has six nested calderas.

Venus

Because there is no plate tectonics on Venus, heat is mainly lost by conduction through the lithosphere. This causes enormous lava flows, accounting for 80% of Venus' surface area.

Io

Io, unusually, is heated by solid flexing due to the tidal influence of Jupiter and Io's orbital resonance with neighboring large moons Europa and Ganymede, which keep its orbit slightly eccentric. Unlike any of the planets mentioned, Io is continuously volcanically active. For example, the NASA Voyager 1 and Voyager 2 spacecraft detected nine erupting volcanoes while passing Io in 1979. Io has many calderas with diameters tens of kilometers across.

List of volcanic calderas

 Africa
 Ngorongoro Crater (Tanzania)
 Menengai Crater (Kenya)
 Mount Elgon (Uganda/Kenya)
 Mount Fogo (Cape Verde)
 Mount Longonot (Kenya)
 Mount Meru (Tanzania)
 Erta Ale (Ethiopia)
 Nabro Volcano (Eritrea)
 Mallahle (Eritrea)
 See Europe for calderas in the Canary Islands
 Americas
 Argentina
 Aguas Calientes, Salta Province
 Caldera del Atuel, Mendoza Province
 Galán, Catamarca Province
 Bolivia
 Pastos Grandes
 United States  
 Mount Aniakchak (Aniakchak National Monument and Preserve) (Alaska)
 Crater Lake on Mount Mazama (Crater Lake National Park, Oregon)
 Mount Katmai (Alaska)
 Kīlauea (Hawaii)
 Mauna Loa (Hawaii)
 La Garita Caldera (Colorado)
 Long Valley (California)
 Henry's Fork Caldera (Idaho)
 Island Park Caldera (Idaho, Wyoming)
 Newberry Volcano (Oregon)
 McDermitt Caldera (Oregon)
 Medicine Lake Volcano (California)
 Mount Okmok (Alaska)
 Valles Caldera (New Mexico)
 Yellowstone Caldera (Wyoming)
 Canada
 Silverthrone Caldera (British Columbia)
 Mount Edziza (British Columbia)
 Bennett Lake Volcanic Complex (British Columbia/Yukon)
 Mount Pleasant Caldera (New Brunswick)
 Sturgeon Lake Caldera (Ontario)
 Mount Skukum Volcanic Complex (Yukon)
 Blake River Megacaldera Complex (Quebec/Ontario)
 New Senator Caldera (Quebec)
 Misema Caldera (Ontario/Quebec)
 Noranda Caldera (Quebec)
 Colombia
 Arenas crater caldera, Nevado del Ruiz volcano, Caldas Department
 Laguna Verde caldera, Azufral volcano, Narino Department
 Mexico
 La primavera Caldera (Jalisco)
 Amealco Caldera (Querétaro)
 Las Cumbres Caldera (Veracruz-Puebla)
 Los Azufres Caldera (Michoacán)
 Los Humeros Caldera (Veracruz-Puebla)
 Mazahua Caldera (Mexico State)
 Chile
 Chaitén
 Cordillera Nevada Caldera
 Laguna del Maule
 Pacana Caldera
 Sollipulli
 Ecuador
 Pululahua Geobotanical Reserve
 Cuicocha
 Quilotoa
 Fernandina Island, Galápagos Islands
 Sierra Negra (Galápagos)
 Chacana Caldera
 El Salvador 
 Lake Ilopango
 Lake Coatepeque
 Guatemala
 Lake Amatitlán
 Lake Atitlán
 Xela
 Barahona
 Other
 Masaya (Nicaragua)
 Asia
 East Asia
 Dakantou Caldera (大墈头) (Shanhuyan Village, Taozhu Town, Linhai, Zhejiang, China)
 Ma'anshan Caldera (马鞍山) (Shishan Town (石山镇), Xiuying, Hainan, China)
 Yiyang Caldera (宜洋) (Shuangxi Town (双溪镇宜洋村), Pingnan County, Fujian, China)
 Aira Caldera (Kagoshima Prefecture, Japan)
 Kussharo (Hokkaido, Japan)
 Kuttara (Hokkaido, Japan)
 Mashū (Hokkaido, Japan)
 Aso Caldera, Mount Aso (Kumamoto Prefecture, Japan)
 Kikai Caldera (Kagoshima Prefecture, Japan)
 Towada (Aomori Prefecture, Japan)
 Tazawa (Akita Prefecture, Japan)
 Hakone (Kanagawa Prefecture, Japan)
 Mount Halla (Jeju-do, South Korea)
 Heaven Lake (Baekdu Mountain, North Korea/Changbai Mountains, China)
 Southeast Asia 
 Apolaki Caldera (Benham Rise, Philippines)
 Corregidor Caldera (Manila Bay, Philippines)
 Mount Pinatubo (Luzon, Philippines)
 Taal Volcano (Luzon, Philippines)
 Laguna Caldera (Luzon, Philippines)
 Irosin Caldera (Luzon, Philippines)
 Batur (Bali, Indonesia)
 Krakatoa (Sunda Strait, Indonesia)
 Lake Maninjau (Sumatra, Indonesia)
 Lake Toba (Sumatra, Indonesia)
 Mount Rinjani (Lombok, Indonesia)
 Mount Tondano (Sulawesi, Indonesia)
 Mount Tambora (Sumbawa, Indonesia)
 Tengger Caldera (Java, Indonesia)
 Southwest Asia
 Derik (Mardin, Turkey)
 Nemrut (volcano) (Turkey)
 Russia 
 Akademia Nauk (Kamchatka Peninsula)
 Golovnin (Kuril Islands)
 Karymsky Caldera (Kamchatka Peninsula)
 Karymshina (Kamchatka Peninsula)
 Khangar (Kamchatka Peninsula)
 Ksudach (Kamchatka Peninsula)
 Kurile Lake (Kamchatka Peninsula)
 Lvinaya Past (Kuril Islands)
 Tao-Rusyr Caldera (Kuril Islands)
 Uzon (Kamchatka Peninsula)
 Zavaritski Caldera (Kuril Islands)
 Yankicha/Ushishir (Kuril Islands)
 Chegem Caldera (Kabardino-Balkarian Republic, North Caucasus)
 Europe   
 Banská Štiavnica (Slovakia)
 Bakuriani/Didveli Caldera (Georgia)
 Samsari (Georgia)
 Santorini (Greece)
 Nisyros (Greece)
 Askja (Iceland)
 Grímsvötn (Iceland)
 Bárðarbunga (Iceland)
 Katla (Iceland)
 Krafla (Iceland)
 Phlegraean Fields (Italy)
 Lake Bracciano (Italy)
 Lake Bolsena (Italy)
 Mount Somma which contains Mount Vesuvius (Italy)
 Las Cañadas (Tenerife, Spain)
 Glen Coe (Scotland)
 Scafell Caldera (Lake District, England)
 Laacher See (Germany)
 Lagoa das Sete Cidades & Furnas (São Miguel, the Azores, Portugal)
 Caldeira do Faial (Faial, Portugal)
 Caldeirão do Corvo (Corvo, Portugal)
 Oceania 
 Cerberean Cauldron (Australia)
 Dakataua (Papua New Guinea)
 Kapenga (New Zealand)
 Kilauea (Hawaii, US)
 Lake Ohakuri (New Zealand)
 Lake Okataina (New Zealand)
 Lake Rotorua (New Zealand)
 Lake Taupo (New Zealand)
 Maroa (New Zealand)
 Moku‘āweoweo Caldera on Mauna Loa (Hawaii, US)
 Mount Warning (Australia)
 Prospect Hill (Australia)
 Rano Kau (Easter Island, Chile)
 Reporoa caldera (New Zealand)
 Antarctica
 Deception Island
 Indian Ocean
 Cirque de Mafate, Cirque de Salazie, Enclos Fouqué, and Cirque de Cilaos on Réunion

Extraterrestrial volcanic calderas
 Mars
 Olympus Mons caldera
 Venus
 Maat Mons caldera

Erosion calderas
 Americas
 Guaichane-Mamuta (Chile)
 Mount Tehama (California, US)
 Europe
 Caldera de Taburiente (Spain)
 Oceania
 Tweed Valley (New South Wales, Queensland, Australia)
 Asia
 Chegem Caldera (Kabardino-Balkarian Republic, Northern Caucasus Region, Russia)
 Taal volcano (Philippines) Batangas Province

See also
 
 
 
 
 

 Explanatory notes 

References

Further reading
 

 Kokelaar, B. P; and Moore, I. D; 2006. Glencoe caldera volcano, Scotland. . Pub. British Geological Survey, Keyworth, Nottinghamshire. There is an associated 1:25000 solid geology map.
 Lipman, P; 1999. "Caldera". In Haraldur Sigurdsson, ed. Encyclopedia of Volcanoes''. Academic Press.

External links

 USGS page on calderas
 List of Caldera Volcanoes
 Collection of references on collapse calderas (43 pages)
 The Caldera of the Tweed Volcano – Australia
 Largest Explosive Eruptions: New results for the 27.8 Ma Fish Canyon Tuff and the La Garita caldera, San Juan volcanic field, Colorado
 Supervolcanoes
 Time-lapse video of Kīlauea caldera collapse, 2018

 
Depressions (geology)
Igneous rocks
Volcanism
Volcanic landforms
.